Dharur  (Telugu:ధరూర్ మండలం(జోగులాంబ గద్వాల)) is a mandal in Jogulamba Gadwal district, Telangana.

Surrounding mandals 
Gadwal, Maldakal, Ghattu, Narva and Raichur District of Karnataka

Political views 
Sathyaram Madhan Mohan Reddy supports the Congress Party.

Gallery

References 

Mandals in Jogulamba Gadwal district